The Interstate XBDR was a design for an assault drone - an early television-guided missile - powered by two jet engines, that was designed by the Interstate Aircraft and Engineering Corporation during the latter stages of the Second World War for use by the United States Navy. Wind tunnel tests of a scale model were conducted, however no full-scale examples of the aircraft were built before the project was cancelled.

Design
Referred to at the time as an "assault drone", and the only aircraft ever designated in the 'BD' series, the XBDR-1 was designed by Interstate in response to a Navy requirement in late 1943 and early 1944. The aircraft featured a tailless design, and was essentially a flying wing with a small vertical stabiliser. The XBDR-1  was intended to be powered by two Westinghouse 19B axial-flow turbojet engines, which were to be buried in the wing near the wing roots. The planned warload was not detailed, however it was planned that the assault drone would be guided to its target via a television link.

Testing and Cancellation

Two prototypes (BuNos 37635 and 37636) were ordered, and tests of a 1/17-scale model of the XBDR were conducted in a NACA gust tunnel at Langley Field in 1944. Requested by the Bureau of Aeronautics in an attempt to determine the load factors of the unusually configured aircraft, these tests initially encountered difficulty with the center of gravity of the model, but once this was resolved the tests were successfully carried out, and a gust factor of 1.22 was recommended for use in the design. Despite the successful testing the Navy decided not to pursue full-scale development of the aircraft, and the order for the two prototypes was cancelled.

Specifications (XBDR-1)

See also

References
Citations

Bibliography

 Grossnick, Roy. "List of Naval Aviation Drones and Missiles".  United States Naval Aviation 1910-1995. Washington, DC: Naval Historical Center, 1997. .
 Leyes, Richard and William A. Fleming. The History of North American Small Gas Turbine Aircraft Engines. American Institute of Aeronautics and Astronautics, 1999. .
 Parsch, Andreas. (2003) Interstate BDR. Directory of U.S. Military Rockets and Missiles. designation-systems.net, accessed 2010-05-15.
 Reisert, Thomas. "Tests of a 1/17-Scale Model of the XBDR-1 Airplane in the NACA Gust Tunnel", NACA Report WR-L-539, 1944

External links

BD01R
Cancelled military aircraft projects of the United States
Twinjets
Flying wings
Tailless aircraft
Unmanned military aircraft of the United States
World War II jet aircraft of the United States
World War II guided missiles of the United States